The following is a list of tropical cyclones that affected the U.S. state of Delaware. Since reliable records began, no tropical cyclone has struck the state while maintaining hurricane intensity, and only two storms since 1851 caused hurricane-force winds in the state. The state often experiences the direct effects of landfalling North Atlantic tropical cyclones and from the remnants of some Pacific storms, such as rainfall or strong winds, as well as the effects of storms that remain offshore, such as rip currents or heavy surf. Since 1749, at least 111 tropical cyclones, some of which had become extratropical, have affected the state, including 21 which passed over the state.

List of tropical cyclones

Pre-1900
October 21, 1749 – A hurricane impacted the Mid-Atlantic, and impacts were observed in Delaware, but it's unclear at what strength the storm was when it impacted the state.
Fall, 1783 – Nine large ships crash near Cape Henlopen during a gale, killing several people.
September 2, 1785 – A hurricane causes 181 deaths in the state. Whether or not it made landfall is unknown.
September 3–5, 1815 – A tropical storm passes over extreme southeastern Delaware. Effects, if any, are unknown.
September 3, 1821 – The eye of the Norfolk and Long Island Hurricane moves directly over Cape Henlopen for 30 minutes.
August 17, 1830 – A hurricane that passes to the east of the state capsizes three ships along the Delaware capes.
August 28–31, 1839 – Several ships are washed ashore in Lewes during a hurricane that parallels the East Coast of the United States.
September 8, 1846 – Rough seas and troubled shipping in the Delaware Bay are caused by a hurricane offshore.
October 13, 1846 – A hurricane crosses over northwestern Delaware, with its powerful winds toppling the steeple of a church in New Castle. The hurricane's storm surge, which is considered the worst in 70 years, floods lowlands in the northern portion of the state.
July 18, 1850 – Rough seas are reported along the Delaware Bay due to a hurricane passing to the west of the state.
August 4, 1850 – A hurricane crosses the state, causing gale-force winds along the coast.
September 8, 1850 – Many ships report calls of distress due to powerful winds from a hurricane.
August 20, 1856 – A tropical storm parallels the coastline of the Delmarva Peninsula, though impact, if any, is unknown.
September 28, 1861 – After weakening from a hurricane, a tropical storm moves northward through Delaware. Effects are unknown.
September 19, 1863 – A tropical storm crosses the state from south to north. Effects are unknown.
October 28, 1872 – A tropical storm crosses the state, with no known effects.
October 5, 1877 – An extratropical storm, once a Category 3 hurricane, crosses the state, causing several ship wrecks in the Chesapeake and Delaware Bays.
October 23, 1878 – The Gale of 1878, which makes landfall on North Carolina, brings hurricane-force winds to the entire state of Delaware. The winds and rain from the storm damages or destroys many houses statewide. The flooding washes out railroads, roads, and bridges, and destroys many carriages in Dover. Crop damage is severe, as well. The strong winds wreck four ships, in total killing 14. A  storm surge in Lewes drowns four when they can't escape the rising waters. Beach erosion is severe, as well. Across Delaware, the hurricane kills 18 and causes $45,000 in damage (1878 USD, $1 million 2008 USD). It is one of only three storms to bring hurricane-force winds to the state.
August 18, 1879 – A Category 2 hurricane parallels the Delmarva Peninsula after striking North Carolina, though effects, if any, are unknown.
September 23, 1882 – A tropical storm crosses over southeastern Delaware. Impact, if any, is unknown.
June 23, 1886 – A tropical depression moves across the state, with no known impact.
September 11, 1888 – An extratropical storm crosses the state.
September 9–12, 1889 – After moving northwestward for much of its life, a large hurricane approaches the East Coast of the United States, moves southwestward, and dissipates to the east of Virginia. The hurricane causes severe waves and a powerful storm surge, damaging life guard stations and wrecking or washing 31 vessels ashore. The death toll "would probably exceed 40", while damage totals $570,000 (1889 USD, $13.6 million 2008 USD).
October 10, 1894 – A hurricane passes to the southeast of the state.
October 23–26, 1897 – A tropical storm moving northward prompts officials to issue hurricane warnings from North Carolina through New York, though the storm unexpectedly executes a loop and moves out to sea.

1900–1949
September 16, 1903 – The Vagabond Hurricane parallels the Delmarva Peninsula coastline and makes landfall on southern New Jersey, bringing Category 1  hurricane-force winds to Delaware. It is one of only three storms to bring hurricane-force winds to the state. The hurricane washes a schooner ashore, killing five.
September 15, 1904 – A tropical storm becomes extratropical as it moves across the state, killing eight people when a tugboat capsizes.
October 24, 1923 – Once a tropical storm in the Caribbean, an extratropical storm moves northwestward through Delaware, causing no known damage.
August 24, 1933 – After making landfall on the Outer Banks, the 1933 Chesapeake Potomac hurricane passes through Virginia and Maryland.
September 18, 1936 – A Category 2 hurricane parallels the Delmarva Peninsula, causing higher than usual tides at Lewes.
September 21, 1938 – The New England Hurricane of 1938 produces moderate to heavy amounts of precipitation across the entire state.
August 20, 1939 – The remnants of a hurricane that struck the Florida Panhandle drop heavy rainfall across the state.
October 1, 1943 – A tropical storm that makes landfall on Maryland passes over western Delaware, though effects, if any, are unknown.
August 3, 1944 – A tropical storm crosses the state, causing no known effects.
September 14, 1944 – The 1944 Great Atlantic Hurricane parallels the East Coast of the United States just offshore, causing damage to 1,800 homes and 850 other buildings. No fatalities are reported in the state.

1950–1974
September 1, 1952 – Tropical Storm Able passes a short distance to the northwest of the state. Damage, if any, is unknown.
August 31 & September 11, 1954 – Hurricanes Carol and Edna parallel the Delmarva Peninsula offshore, causing no known damage.
The hurricane causes at least one death in the state.
September 19, 1955 – Hurricane Ione makes landfall in North Carolina, with its outer moisture producing light rainfall across the state.
September 28, 1956 – The remnants of Hurricane Flossy drop light rainfall along the coastline.
August 29, 1958 – Hurricane Daisy remains offshore, though causes rough seas along the coast.
July 30, 1960 – Tropical Storm Brenda crosses over southeastern Delaware. Effects, if any, are unknown.
September 12, 1960 – Hurricane Donna passes to the east of the state, causing hurricane-force gusts, above normal tides, strong surf, and storm surge to the coastline.
September 15, 1961 – An unnamed tropical storm moves across the state. Damage, if any, is unknown.
The waves produces coastal flooding along the Maryland and Delaware coastline.
October 29, 1963 – Hurricane Ginny produces trace precipitation in the state.
September 14, 1964 – Tropical Storm Dora causes above-normal tides and light rain to Delaware.

October 1964 – Moisture from Hurricane Hilda produces light amounts of precipitation across the state.
October 17, 1964 – The remnants of Hurricane Isbell drop light rainfall throughout the state.
September 9, 1969 – Hurricane Gerda attains major hurricane status well to the east of the state, though its outer rainbands result in light to moderate precipitation across the state.
October 1, 1971 – Hurricane Ginger makes landfall on North Carolina, with its remnants producing light rainfall in Delaware.
The storm causes light damage and 1 death in Delaware.
September 3, 1972 – Tropical Storm Carrie passes well to the east of the state, with its outer rainbands dropping moderate rainfall across much of southern Delaware.

1975–1999
August 9, 1976 – Hurricane Belle parallels the Delmarva Peninsula, prompting officials to issue hurricane warnings for the Delaware coastline. The core of the hurricane passes slightly to the east of the state, and consequentially produces lighter winds and less rainfall than expected but still a powerful storm.
The tornado outbreak caused by David extends into Delaware. One such tornado damages a few homes and injures five in New Castle County.
July 1, 1981 – Tropical Storm Bret moves ashore along the Delmarva Peninsula and produces light rainfall in Delaware.
November 15, 1981 – A subtropical storm slowly moves through the western Atlantic, causing higher than normal tides along the Delaware coastline.
September 30, 1983 – Tropical Storm Dean produces light rainfall in southeastern Delaware when it makes landfall on eastern Virginia.
October 1983 – The remnants of Hurricane Tico drop light rainfall across the state.

September 24, 1985 – While paralleling the state, Tropical Storm Henri drops light rainfall of around  near the coast.
September 27, 1985 – Hurricane Gloria passes to the east of the state, causing hurricane-force wind gusts and moderate amounts of rainfall. The hurricane causes significant beach erosion along the coast.
August 18, 1986 – Hurricane Charley parallels the Mid-Atlantic coastline offshore, producing hurricane-force wind gusts and light rainfall in Delaware.
September 1987 – Tropical Depression Nine drops light precipitation in the state.
August 29, 1988 – Tropical Depression Chris produces light rainfall across Delaware, though damage, if any, is unknown.
There were no reports of damage in the state.
August 1992 – The remnants of Hurricane Andrew produce light rainfall in the state.
September 26, 1992 – Tropical Storm Danielle moves northwestward through the state, causing severe beach erosion and washouts along the coast.
September 1, 1993 – Hurricane Emily passes well to the southeast of Delaware, causing trace amounts of precipitation and slightly higher than normal tides in Lewes.

August 18, 1994 – The remnants of Tropical Storm Beryl produce light rainfall across the state.
June 6, 1995 – The remnants of Hurricane Allison cause light amounts of rainfall in the state's southeastern portion.
August 13–21, 1995 – Swells and  waves generated by Hurricane Felix restrict beaches along the coastline. In addition, the waves cause beach erosion and minor tidal flooding.
The winds down scattered trees, signs, and power lines, leaving 3,200 homes without power for 8 hours. The storm produces moderate rainfall across the state, causing drainage problems. Prior to moving across the state, Bertha causes rough surf, resulting in 40 water rescues. Overall damage is minor, and no deaths occurred.
August 29–31, 1996 – Hurricane Edouard causes rough surf along the Delaware coastline, closing some beaches.
The rainfall causes river flooding, while the wind knocks down tree limbs.
July 25, 1997 – Tropical Storm Danny passes to the southeast of the state, dropping light precipitation throughout Delaware.
August 28, 1998 – Strong waves and rip currents are caused by Hurricane Bonnie over the western Atlantic Ocean. The currents drown one person and result in bathing restrictions and over 14 lifeguard rescues at Rehoboth Beach.

August 29–31, 1999 – The combination of swells from Hurricane Dennis and strong northeasterly winds produce strong rip currents along the Delaware coastline. The currents result in nearly 100 rescues and four injuries, and also forces beach closures and restrictions. The strong winds and waves cause beach erosion, as well.
September 16, 1999 – Tropical Storm Floyd crosses over the southeastern portion of the state. The flooding, which exceeds the 100-year flood return period, kills two and causes record-breaking river levels across the state. Hundreds of roads, railroad lines, and bridges are closed or destroyed, trapping dozens due to flooded vehicles. The winds uproot hundreds of trees, leaving 25,000 homes and businesses without power for 3 days. Floyd damages 171 homes, 44 severely, and destroys 33 in New Castle County. Damage is minimal near the ocean, and amounts to minor beach erosion and tidal flooding. Throughout the state, damage totals to $8.42 million (1999 USD, $10.9 million 2008 USD). In response to the damage, President Bill Clinton declares the state as a disaster area, which allows for federal funding to rebuild and cleanup after the storm.
The flooding causes some drainage problems, though damage is minor.

2000–2008
June 16, 2001 – The subtropical remnant of what was once Tropical Storm Allison passes just to the southeast of the state.
September 11, 2001 – Hurricane Erin generates rough surf and rip currents along Delaware beaches, forcing restrictions and closures.
The flooding damages hundreds of houses, and traps motorists in submerged vehicles. Damage totals $16.1 million (2003 USD, $18.9 million 2008 USD). Due to the damage, President George W. Bush declares the state a disaster area.
September 17, 2003 – Hurricane Isabel passes to the southwest of the state as it makes landfall on North Carolina. In the days preceding its landfall, Isabel produces strong waves, and upon striking land, the storm causes a  storm surge along the Delaware coast. The waves and surge result in beach erosion and overwash. The wind gusts knock down many trees and power lines, causing one of the worst power outages for Conectiv Energy. Damage totals to $40 million (2003 USD, $54.6 million 2019 USD). Due to the damage, President Bush declares the entire state a disaster area.

August 3, 2004 – Heavy surf from Hurricane Alex injures three in Rehoboth Beach. The rough waters result in rescues, as well.
The rainfall leads to flooded rivers and roads, forcing the evacuation of 100 people in Delaware City.
August 30, 2004 – Moisture from Hurricane Gaston drops moderate amounts of rainfall, leading to minor stream and drainage flooding.
September 3, 2004 – The combination of swells from Hurricane Frances and a high-pressure system causes rip currents along the Delaware coastline.
September 18, 2004 – The remnants of Hurricane Ivan produce heavy rainfall for a few hours, causing creek flooding and drainage problems. Damage is minimal.
The precipitation leads to rising rivers, including the Red clay Creek which crests at  The rainfall also floods roads in the northern portion of the state, resulting in trapped vehicles. The remnants of Jeanne also spawn an F2 tornado in northern New Castle County. The tornado's  path includes moving through the New Castle Airport and several buildings. The tornado damages numerous planes and buildings at the airport and injures five people. Damage totals to around $1 million (2004 USD).
The combination of rain and  wind gusts down a few weak trees, leaving around 100 without power in New Castle County.
Mid-July 2005 – The outer rainbands of Hurricane Dennis drop light precipitation of around  throughout the state.
September 16, 2005 – Rip currents are caused by Hurricane Ophelia passing to the southeast of the state.
The rainfall causes drainage problems and crop damage.
October 24, 2005 – The combination of Hurricane Wilma and a Nor'easter produce heavy surf, high tides, and beach erosion along the coastline.
June 14, 2006 – The extratropical remnants of Tropical Storm Alberto drop light rain in the southeastern portion of the state.
September 1, 2006 – The combined effects of Tropical Storm Ernesto and a large high-pressure system leave about 151,000 without power and several trees damaged from strong winds.
June 4, 2007 – The remnants of Tropical Storm Barry dropped light rainfall in the state.
September 6, 2008 – Tropical Storm Hanna produces heavy rain and strong winds in the state. Minor tidal flooding is reported in the Delaware Bay.

2010s
Two fatalities can be attributed to the storm in the state.
 September 7–10, 2011 – The remnants of Tropical Storm Lee move over the east coast, resulting in strong winds and heavy rain.
 October 28 – November 1, 2011 – Hurricane Rina did not affect the United States directly, but its remnants joined with a large cold front to fuel the 2011 Halloween nor'easter. 
 September 1–4, 2012 – The remnants of Hurricane Isaac move over the eastern coast, causing heavy rains over Delaware and other east coast states.
 October 29–30, 2012 – Hurricane Sandy affects the entire state.
 September 19, 2017 – Waves from Hurricane Jose cause coastal flooding in Delaware.
 October 11–12, 2018 – Wind and rain from Tropical Storm Michael causes minor coastal flooding, heavy rain and some strong winds in the Delmarva Peninsula.

2020s
 July 7, 2020 – Tropical Storm Fay passes just east of state, producing gusty winds and heavy rainfall to the region.
 August 4, 2020 – Hurricane Isaias moves directly across the state, spawning tornadoes and widespread power outages, resulting in the first hurricane related death since 2011.
 October 29, 2020 – Hurricane Zeta affects Delaware as a post-tropical cyclone.

Listed by month
Since 1749, 108 tropical cyclones, including some that became extratropical, have affected the state. Most have occurred in September, which coincides with the peak of the Atlantic hurricane season.

Deadliest storms
Most tropical cyclones that impact Delaware only cause rainfall or strong waves, though a few have caused deaths in the state. Storms that caused deaths in Delaware include:

See also

 List of New Jersey hurricanes
 Atlantic hurricane season
 List of Atlantic hurricanes
 Tropical cyclone
 Effects of Hurricane Isabel in Delaware

References

Delaware
Delaware
 
Hurricanes